Pekka Juhani Tuomisto (born December 29, 1960) is a Finnish retired professional ice hockey player who played in the SM-liiga.  Born in Oulu, Finland, he played for Kärpät and HIFK.

Tuomisto was inducted into the Finnish Hockey Hall of Fame in 2000.

Career statistics

Regular season and playoffs

International

External links
 Finnish Hockey Hall of Fame bio
 
 

1960 births
Living people
Finnish ice hockey right wingers
HIFK (ice hockey) players
Ice hockey players at the 1988 Winter Olympics
Ice hockey players at the 1992 Winter Olympics
Olympic ice hockey players of Finland
Olympic medalists in ice hockey
Olympic silver medalists for Finland
Oulun Kärpät players
Sportspeople from Oulu